The Second Universal of the Ukrainian Central Council is a state-political act, universal of the Central Council of Ukraine, which fixed the agreements between the Ukrainian Central Rada and the Provisional Government of Russian Republic. Proclaimed by Volodymyr Vynnychenko  in Kyiv, at a solemn meeting at the Pedagogical Museum in response to a telegram from the Provisional Government to the Central Rada.

Description 
According to the Universal, the Provisional Government recognized Ukraine's right to autonomy, and the UCR and the General Secretariat recognized public authorities in Ukraine. Instead, the UCR was forced to agree that the question of the form of autonomy would be finally resolved by the All-Russian Constituent Assembly and to recognize that Ukraine did not claim full state independence. The Central Council accepted the conditions of the Provisional Government to expand its membership at the expense of representatives of national minorities of Ukraine. It undertook to draft laws on Ukrainian autonomy for consideration by the Constituent Assembly of Russia. In fact, the territory of the autonomous Ukrainian People's Republic included the territories of Kyiv, Podil, Volyn, Chernihiv, and Poltava Governorates. As for the army, the Universal states:

II Universal is ambiguously perceived by Ukrainians. Many of them regarded him as a betrayal, calling him "the second Pereyaslav." Mykola Mikhnovskyi, the leader of the Ukrainian nationalists, sharply, partly fair, criticized him. The Russians benefited more from the Ukrainian-Russian treaty (namely, the Universal in combination with the Declaration of the Provisional Government). Recognizing the right of Ukrainians to autonomy, the Provisional Government did not give them anything more than what they had already gained without his blessing. Thus, in particular, she assured that she was determined "against the intentions of the unauthorized exercise of Ukraine's autonomy" to convene the Constituent Assembly. Thus, in particular, she assured that she was determined "against the intentions of unauthorized implementation of the autonomy of Ukraine" to convene the Constituent Assembly. In addition, the UCR voluntarily gave the Provisional Government the right to approve members of the Ukrainian General Secretariat, which previously belonged to it. Thus, in the political sense, it was a step backwards in the development of the Ukrainian revolution. At the same time, it was a compromise.

Historiography 
The Second Universal of the Ukrainian Central Rada does not have a unanimous assessment among contemporaries and researchers. For example, Mykhailo Hrushevskyi (who was the head of the UCR at the time) believed that "the UCR's understanding with the Russian government opened a new page in the life of Ukraine." Modern researcher Yaroslav Hrytsak notes that "without a doubt, the Second Universal was a step backwards compared to the First Universal."

See also 

 Constitution of the Ukrainian People's Republic
 Universals
 First Universal of the Ukrainian Central Council
 Third Universal of the Ukrainian Central Council
 Fourth Universal of the Ukrainian Central Council
 Unification Act

 Russian Constituent Assembly
 Ukrainian Constituent Assembly

External links 

 Другий універсал Української Центральної Ради (робочий варіант), 03 липня 1917 р. // ЦДАВО України, ф. 1115, оп. 1, спр. 5, арк. 10—11.
 (ІІ) Універсал Української Центральної Ради // Офіційна сторінка Верховної Ради України

Further reading 

 
 О. Б. Кудлай. Другий Універсал Української Центральної Ради // Енциклопедія історії України : у 10 т. / редкол.: В. А. Смолій (голова) та ін. ; Інститут історії України НАН України. — Київ. : Наукова думка, 2004. — Т. 2 : Г — Д. — С. 474. — 518 с. : іл. — .
 О. М. Мироненко. Другий Універсал Української Центральної Ради // Енциклопедія сучасної України : у 30 т. / ред. кол. І. М. Дзюба [та ін.] ; НАН України, НТШ. — Київ. : Інститут енциклопедичних досліджень НАН України, 2001–2020. — 10 000 прим. — Volume 7: Вод – Гн, .

Political history of Ukraine
Government of Ukraine
1917 in law
1917 documents
1917 in international relations
Dissolution of the Russian Empire
Ukrainian independence movement
1917 in Ukraine
July 1917 events